The golden-naped weaver (Ploceus aureonucha) is a species of bird in the family Ploceidae. It is found in the northeastern Democratic Republic of the Congo.

Its natural habitat is subtropical or tropical moist lowland forests. It is threatened by habitat loss.

References

External links
BirdLife Species Factsheet.

golden-naped weaver
Birds of Central Africa
Endemic birds of the Democratic Republic of the Congo
golden-naped weaver
Taxonomy articles created by Polbot